Augusta (archaically Agosta;  ; Greek and , Medieval: Augusta) is a town and  in the province of Syracuse, located on the eastern coast of Sicily (southern Italy). The city is one of the main harbours in Italy, especially for oil refineries (Sonatrach and others as part of the complex Augusta-Priolo) which are in its vicinity.

Geography
The city is situated in the province of Syracuse and faces the Ionian Sea.  The old town is an island, made in the 16th century by cutting an isthmus and is connected to the mainland by two bridges. One bridge was built recently (Viaduct Frederick II of Swabia) and the other was built when the city was founded and is called the Porta Spagnola.  Augusta is home to two ports.

History
Founded 27 centuries ago, Megara Hyblaea is one of the oldest Greek colonies of Sicily. It was destroyed by its rival Syracuse, was raised from its ruins, then taken by the Romans together with Syracuse during the Second Punic War. It remains an archaeological site, a testimony of the organization of a Greek colony of the Archaic period.

Upon the ruins of one of its suburbs, Xiphonia, the city of Augusta was founded in 1232 by Emperor Frederick II.  After the Angevin domination, it became part of Aragonese Sicily and, from 1362, it was a fief of Guglielmo Raimondo II Moncada. It returned to be a royal possession (under Spain) in 1560, and was extensively fortified to counter Turkish pirates.

In 1675 its harbor was the site of a naval battle between the Dutch-Spanish and the French fleets. The town suffered a major earthquake and tsunami in 1693.

During World War II Augusta was a hotbed of anti-Mussolini sentiment and anti-fascist sentiment more generally, as was all of Sicily. Because of the strongarm tactics that the Mussolini regime used to subdue Sicily, the fascist regime was very unpopular on the island, including in Augusta. When British and American forces arrived in Sicily, the Sicilians did not regard them as conquering invaders but rather greeted them as "emancipators come to lift the evil burden of fascism from their shoulders." All across Sicily the invading forces were greeted with relief and often with unbridled enthusiasm.

During Operation Husky, the combined British and American effort to dislodge fascist forces from Sicily, the plan was for British forces under General Montgomery to capture Augusta during the first few days of the operation.  This part of the operation went entirely according to plan and Augusta was captured on July 13, 1943, by the British Eighth Army, led by Britain's General Montgomery. Almost immediately thereafter British forces began moving north towards Catania.

Main sights

Castello Svevo (Hohenstaufen Castle, built c. 1232). It has a square plan of a  side length, with eight towers
Capo Santa Croce Lighthouse
Church of Anime Sante del Purgatorio (S. Nicolò). The Baroque façade is attributed to Filippo Juvarra
Church of Carmine
Church of Cristo Re
Church of Maria Santissima Assunta (Augusta)
Church of Maria Santissima del Soccorso
Church of Sacro Cuore
Church of San Domenico (13th century). The façade is in Neoclassical style
Church of San Francesco di Paola
Church of San Giuseppe
Church of Santa Maria Delle Grazie
Church of Santa Maria del Soccorso
Church of San Sebastiano
Church of Sant'Andrea
Church of Santa Lucia
Convent of the Dominican Fathers
Eremo Adonai
Forti Garsia e Vittoria
Hangar dirigibili Augusta
Kursaal Augusto
Porta Spagnola
Ricetta di Malta
Porta Spagnola (17th century)
Torre Avalos

Notable people
 Emanuele d'Astorga, composer
 Orso Mario Corbino, physicist
 Epicarmo Corbino, economist
 Giuseppe Di Mare (composer), organist, pianist and composer
 Rosario Fiorello, showman
 Beppe Fiorello, actor
 Alfredo Maria Garsia, Bishop of Caltanissetta
 Marcello Guagliardo Giordani, opera singer (tenor)
 Giovanni Lavaggi, Formula 1 driver
 Roy Paci, musician
 Antonio Scaduto, canoeist
 Riccardo Schicchi, director
 Chiara Strazzulla, writer

References

External links

Augusta port facilities  
Augusta Boston Club

 Municipalities of the Province of Syracuse
Populated coastal places in Italy